Thielenplatz/Schauspielhaus is a Hanover Stadtbahn station served by lines 10 and 17.

Hanover Stadtbahn stations